Santa Ana Hueytlalpan Otomi is a native American language spoken in Santa Ana Hueytlalpan town of Tulancingo de Bravo municipality of Hidalgo, Mexico. It has been classified as Eastern Otomi by Lastra (2006), but is not included in Ethnologue.

Notes

Otomi language